Carpal arch may refer to:

 Dorsal carpal arch
 Palmar carpal arch
 Deep palmar arch
 Superficial palmar arch